Panara is a census town in Chhindwara district in the Indian state of Madhya Pradesh.

Geography
It has an average elevation of 733 metres (2,404 feet).

Demographics
 India census, Panara had a population of 4,144. Males constitute 50% of the population and females 50%. Panara has an average literacy rate of 69%, higher than the national average of 59.5%: male literacy is 76%, and female literacy is 62%. In Panara, 11% of the population is under 6 years of age.

References

Cities and towns in Chhindwara district